
Gmina Kołbiel is a rural gmina (administrative district) in Otwock County, Masovian Voivodeship, in east-central Poland.

The gmina contains part of the protected area called Masovian Landscape Park.

Villages
Gmina Kołbiel contains the villages and settlements of Antoninek, Bocian, Borków, Chrosna, Chrząszczówka, Człekówka, Dobrzyniec, Gadka, Głupianka, Gózd, Karpiska, Kąty, Kołbiel, Lubice, Nowa Wieś, Oleksin, Podgórzno, Radachówka, Rudno, Rudzienko, Sępochów, Siwianka, Skorupy, Stara Wieś Druga, Sufczyn, Teresin, Władzin and Wola Sufczyńska.

Neighbouring gminas
Gmina Kołbiel is bordered by the gminas of Celestynów, Mińsk Mazowiecki, Osieck, Pilawa, Siennica and Wiązowna.

References
Polish official population figures 2006

Kolbiel
Otwock County